Marie Sherlock is an Irish Labour Party politician who has been a Senator for the Labour Panel since April 2020.

Early life and education
Sherlock is from Carrignavar, County Cork. She attended Colaiste An Chroi Naofa before graduating with a Bachelor of Arts in Economics and Political Science from Trinity College Dublin, a Master of Arts in Economics from University College Dublin, and a Master of Philosophy in Land Economy from the University of Cambridge.

Political career
She represented the Cabra-Glasnevin local electoral area on Dublin City Council from 2019 to 2020 and was the party's Head of Manifesto Development.

At the Seanad election in March/April 2020, she was elected to Seanad Éireann on the Labour Panel.

Declan Meenagh was co-opted to Sherlock's seat on Dublin City Council following her election to the Seanad. She was also a researcher for the Party of European Socialists in the European Parliament and was a trade union official and economic advisor to SIPTU for over 10 years.

Personal life
She lives in Phibsborough with her husband Ciarán and their three children.

References

External links
Marie Sherlock's page on the Labour Party website

Living people
Year of birth missing (living people)
Alumni of the University of Cambridge
Alumni of Trinity College Dublin
Alumni of University College Dublin
Irish trade unionists
Labour Party (Ireland) senators
Members of the 26th Seanad
21st-century women members of Seanad Éireann
Politicians from County Cork